The siege of Brescia occurred in 1238. After his victory the previous year at the battle of Cortenuova, Emperor Frederick sought to bring about the unconditional surrender of the city of Milan and its allies. Assembling his army in Verona in April 1238, he decided to besiege the Guelf town of Brescia. Emperor Frederick began the siege on 11 July 1238 and it lasted until a successful sortie by the city's defenders in early October forced him to lift the siege.

References

Brescia 1238
Brescia 1238
Brescia
1238 in Europe
Brescia
Brescia
13th century in Italy
1230s in the Holy Roman Empire
Frederick II, Holy Roman Emperor